Boston is an unincorporated community in Williamson County, Tennessee. The Sparkman-Skelley Farm, which is listed on the National Register of Historic Places, is located in Boston.

References

Unincorporated communities in Williamson County, Tennessee
Unincorporated communities in Tennessee